Inahamne is a lake in Lääne County Lääne-Nigula Parish on the island of Osmussaar.

The lake lies in the southern part of Osmussaar,  from Storhamne bay.

References 

Lääne-Nigula Parish
Lakes of Estonia